Vodyanovsky is a rural locality (a khutor) in Pristenovskoye Rural Settlement, Chernyshkovsky District, Volgograd Oblast, Russia. The population was 144 as of 2010. There are 2 streets.

Geography 
Vodyanovsky is located on 63 km southeast of Chernyshkovsky (the district's administrative centre) by road. Pristenovsky is the nearest rural locality.

References 

Rural localities in Chernyshkovsky District